Goggia matzikamaensis is a species of gecko. It is found in South Africa.

References

Goggia
Reptiles described in 2017